Agdistis jansei is a moth in the family Pterophoridae. It is known from South Africa (Northern Cape, Western Cape, Free State, Mpumalanga).

The wingspan is 19–26 mm. The forewings are grey with two dots in the discal area and at the costal margin, confluent forming an oblique streak. In some specimens the streak is not formed but two separate dots are present. Other dots are very weak. The hindwings are uniformly grey. Adults are on wing from March to October.

Etymology
The species is named after Dr Anthonie Johannes Theodorus Janse, South African teacher and entomologist from the Hague, Netherlands.

References

Endemic moths of South Africa
Agdistinae
Moths of Africa
Moths described in 2009